Bastar-Murriz is a village in the former municipality of Zall-Bastar in Tirana County, Albania. At the 2015 local government reform it became part of the municipality Tirana.

Demographic history 
the village of Bastari appears in the Ottoman defter of 1467 as a part of the timar of Mustafa in the nahiyah of Benda. It was a relatively small settlement with a total of only five households which were represented by: Miho Manesi, Gjon Guribardi, Gjergj Shurbi, Kola Zhari, and Dom Miho.

References

Populated places in Tirana
Villages in Tirana County